The Day of the Beast is a 1922 novel by Zane Grey.

Plot introduction 
Daren Lane, a World War I veteran, returns from the battlefields of Europe to the American Midwest. In Middletown USA, he encounters a postwar Jazz Age society whose revelers are tired of hearing about the war. Lane attempts to stem the tide of hedonism and debauchery that is sweeping the town with mixed results.

External links 

 

1922 American novels
Novels by Zane Grey
Novels set in the Roaring Twenties